Francesca Di Lorenzo was the defending champion, but lost in the second round to Jessika Ponchet.

Caroline Dolehide won the title, defeating Mayo Hibi 6–3, 6–4 in the final.

Seeds

Draw

Finals

Top half

Bottom half

References
Main Draw

Winnipeg National Bank Challenger
Winnipeg Challenger